Yangwang (Chinese: "仰望", which literally means "looking up" ) is a Chinese luxury electric car brand owned by BYD Auto. The brand logo is "Lightning" in oracle bone script. It is the first car brand to introduce BYD's proprietary individual wheel drive (IWD) technology platform called "e4".

The brand's first model, the U8 full-size SUV, was officially unveiled on January 5, 2023 at the Guangzhou Auto Show, before hitting the Chinese market in the second quarter of 2023. At the same show, BYD's CEO Wang Chuanfu also unveiled the U9, an electric hypercar claiming a 0-100 kph time of just 2 seconds.

Models
 Yangwang U8 electric off-road capable amphibious SUV (2023, to commence)
 Yangwang U9 electric supercar (2023, to commence)

References

Car manufacturers of China
BYD Auto
Luxury motor vehicle manufacturers